Samoa, officially the Independent State of Samoa and until 1997 known as Western Samoa, is a Polynesian island country consisting of two main islands (Savai'i and Upolu); two smaller, inhabited islands (Manono and Apolima); and several smaller, uninhabited islands, including the Aleipata Islands (Nu'utele, Nu'ulua, Fanuatapu and Namua). The capital city is Apia. The Lapita people discovered and settled the Samoan Islands around 3,500 years ago. They developed a Samoan language and Samoan cultural identity.

Samoa is a unitary parliamentary democracy with 11 administrative divisions. It is a sovereign state and a member of the Commonwealth of Nations. Western Samoa was admitted to the United Nations on 15 December 1976. Because of the Samoans' seafaring skills, pre-20th-century European explorers referred to the entire island group (which includes American Samoa) as the "Navigator Islands". The country was a colony of the German Empire from 1899 to 1915, then came under a joint British and New Zealand colonial administration until 1 January 1962, when it became independent.

History

Early history
Samoa was discovered and settled by the Lapita people (Austronesian people who spoke Oceanic languages), who travelled from Island Melanesia. The earliest human remains found in Samoa are dated to between roughly 2,900 and 3,500 years ago. The remains were discovered at a Lapita site at Mulifanua, and the scientists' findings were published in 1974. The Samoans' origins have been studied in modern times through scientific research on Polynesian genetics, linguistics and anthropology. Although this research is ongoing, a number of theories have been proposed. One theory is that the original Samoans were Austronesians who arrived during a final period of eastward expansion of the Lapita peoples out of Southeast Asia and Melanesia between 2,500 and 1,500 BCE.

Intimate sociocultural and genetic ties were maintained between Samoa, Fiji, and Tonga, and the archaeological record supports oral tradition and native genealogies that indicate interisland voyaging and intermarriage among precolonial Samoans, Fijians, and Tongans. Notable figures in Samoan history included the Tui Manu'a line, Queen Salamasina, King Fonoti and the four tama-a-aiga: Malietoa, Tupua Tamasese, Mata'afa, and Tuimalealiifano. Nafanua was a famous woman warrior who was deified in ancient Samoan religion and whose patronage was highly sought after by successive Samoan rulers.

Today, all of Samoa is united under its two principal royal families: the Sā Malietoa of the ancient Malietoa lineage that defeated the Tongans in the 13th century; and the Sā Tupua, Queen Salamasina's descendants and heirs who ruled Samoa in the centuries that followed her reign. Within these two principal lineages are the four highest titles of Samoa - the elder titles of Malietoa and Tupua Tamasese of antiquity and the newer Mata'afa and Tuimalealiifano titles, which rose to prominence in 19th-century wars that preceded the colonial period. These four titles form the apex of the Samoan matai system as it stands today.

Contact with Europeans began in the early 18th century. Jacob Roggeveen, a Dutchman, was the first known non-Polynesian to sight the Samoan islands in 1722. This visit was followed by French explorer Louis-Antoine de Bougainville, who named them the Navigator Islands in 1768. Contact was limited before the 1830s, which is when English missionaries, whalers, and traders began arriving.

19th century

Visits by American trading and whaling vessels were important in the early economic development of Samoa. The Salem brig Roscoe (Captain Benjamin Vanderford), in October 1821, was the first American trading vessel known to have called, and the Maro (Captain Richard Macy) of Nantucket, in 1824, was the first recorded United States whaler at Samoa. The whalers came for fresh drinking water, firewood and provisions, and later, they recruited local men to serve as crewmen on their ships. The last recorded whaler visitor was the Governor Morton in 1870.

Christian missionary work in Samoa began in 1830 when John Williams of the London Missionary Society arrived in Sapapali'i from the Cook Islands and Tahiti. According to Barbara A. West, "The Samoans were also known to engage in 'headhunting', a ritual of war in which a warrior took the head of his slain opponent to give to his leader, thus proving his bravery."

In A Footnote to History: Eight Years of Trouble in Samoa (1892), Robert Louis Stevenson details the activities of the great powers battling for influence in Samoa – the United States, Germany and Britain – and the political machinations of the various Samoan factions within their indigenous political system. Even as they descended into ever greater interclan warfare, what most alarmed Stevenson was the Samoans' economic innocence. In 1894, just months before his death, he addressed the island chiefs:There is but one way to defend Samoa. Hear it before it is too late. It is to make roads, and gardens, and care for your trees, and sell their produce wisely, and, in one word, to occupy and use your country... if you do not occupy and use your country, others will. It will not continue to be yours or your children's, if you occupy it for nothing. You and your children will in that case be cast out into outer darkness". He had "seen these judgments of God" in Hawaii, where abandoned native churches stood like tombstones "over a grave, in the midst of the white men's sugar fields".

The Germans, in particular, began to show great commercial interest in the Samoan Islands, especially on the island of Upolu, where German firms monopolised copra and cocoa bean processing. The United States laid its own claim, based on commercial shipping interests in Pearl Harbor in Hawaii and Pago Pago Bay in eastern Samoa, and forced alliances, most conspicuously on the islands of Tutuila and Manu'a, which became American Samoa.

Britain also sent troops to protect British business enterprise, harbour rights, and consulate office. This was followed by an eight-year civil war, during which each of the three powers supplied arms, training and in some cases combat troops to the warring Samoan parties. The Samoan crisis came to a critical juncture in March 1889 when all three colonial contenders sent warships into Apia harbour, and a larger-scale war seemed imminent. A massive storm on 15 March 1889 damaged or destroyed the warships, ending the military conflict.

The Second Samoan Civil War reached a head in 1898 when Germany, the United Kingdom, and the United States were locked in dispute over who should control the Samoan Islands. The Siege of Apia occurred in March 1899. Samoan forces loyal to Prince Tanu were besieged by a larger force of Samoan rebels loyal to Mata'afa Iosefo. Supporting Prince Tanu were landing parties from four British and American warships. After several days of fighting, the Samoan rebels were finally defeated.

American and British warships shelled Apia on 15 March 1899, including the USS Philadelphia. Germany, the United Kingdom and the United States quickly resolved to end the hostilities and divided the island chain at the Tripartite Convention of 1899, signed at Washington on 2 December 1899 with ratifications exchanged on 16 February 1900.

The eastern island-group became a territory of the United States (the Tutuila Islands in 1900 and officially Manu'a in 1904) and was known as American Samoa. The western islands, by far the greater landmass, became German Samoa. The United Kingdom had vacated all claims in Samoa and in return received (1) termination of German rights in Tonga, (2) all of the Solomon Islands south of Bougainville, and (3) territorial alignments in West Africa.

German Samoa (1900–1914)

The German Empire governed the western part of the Samoan archipelago from 1900 to 1914. Wilhelm Solf was appointed the colony's first governor. In 1908, when the non-violent Mau a Pule resistance movement arose, Solf did not hesitate to banish the Mau leader Lauaki Namulau'ulu Mamoe to Saipan in the German Northern Mariana Islands.

The German colonial administration governed on the principle that "there was only one government in the islands." Thus, there was no Samoan Tupu (king), nor an alii sili (similar to a governor), but two Fautua (advisors) were appointed by the colonial government. Tumua and Pule (traditional governments of Upolu and Savai'i) were for a time silent; all decisions on matters affecting lands and titles were under the control of the colonial Governor.

In the first month of World War I, on 29 August 1914, troops of the New Zealand Expeditionary Force landed unopposed on Upolu and seized control from the German authorities, following a request by Great Britain for New Zealand to perform this "great and urgent imperial service."

New Zealand rule (1914–1961)

From the end of World War I until 1962, New Zealand controlled Western Samoa as a Class C Mandate under trusteeship through the League of Nations, then through the United Nations. Between 1919 and 1962, Samoa was administered by the Department of External Affairs, a government department which had been specially created to oversee New Zealand's Island Territories and Samoa. In 1943, this department was renamed the Department of Island Territories after a separate Department of External Affairs was created to conduct New Zealand's foreign affairs. During the period of New Zealand control, their administrators were responsible for two major incidents.

Flu pandemic

In the first incident, approximately one fifth of the Samoan population died in the influenza epidemic of 1918–1919.

In 1918, during the final stages of World War I, the Spanish flu had taken its toll, spreading rapidly from country to country. On Samoa, there had been no epidemic of pneumonic influenza in Western Samoa before the arrival of the SS Talune from Auckland on 7 November 1918. The NZ administration allowed the ship to berth in breach of quarantine; within seven days of this ship's arrival, influenza became epidemic in Upolu and then spread rapidly throughout the rest of the territory. Samoa suffered the most of all Pacific islands, with 90% of the population infected; 30% of adult men, 22% of adult women and 10% of children died. The cause of the epidemic was confirmed in 1919 by a Royal Commission of Inquiry into the Epidemic concluded that there had been no epidemic of pneumonic influenza in Western Samoa before the arrival of the Talune from Auckland on 7 November 1918.

The pandemic undermined Samoan confidence in New Zealand's administrative capacity and competence. Some Samoans asked that the rule of the islands be transferred to the Americans or the British.

Mau movement

The second major incident arose out of an initially peaceful protest by the Mau (which literally translates as "strongly held opinion"), a non-violent popular movement which had its beginnings in the early 1900s on Savai'i, led by Lauaki Namulauulu Mamoe, an orator chief deposed by Solf. In 1909, Lauaki was exiled to Saipan and died en route back to Samoa in 1915.

By 1918, Western Samoa had a population of some 38,000 Samoans and 1,500 Europeans.

However, native Samoans greatly resented New Zealand's colonial rule, and blamed inflation and the catastrophic 1918 flu epidemic on its misrule. By the late 1920s the resistance movement against colonial rule had gathered widespread support. One of the Mau leaders was Olaf Frederick Nelson, a half Samoan and half Swedish merchant. Nelson was eventually exiled during the late 1920s and early 1930s, but he continued to assist the organisation financially and politically. In accordance with the Mau's non-violent philosophy, the newly elected leader, High Chief Tupua Tamasese Lealofi, led his fellow uniformed Mau in a peaceful demonstration in downtown Apia on 28 December 1929.

The New Zealand police attempted to arrest one of the leaders in the demonstration. When he resisted, a struggle developed between the police and the Mau. The officers began to fire randomly into the crowd and used a Lewis machine gun, mounted in preparation for the demonstration, to disperse the demonstrators. Mau leader and paramount chief Tupua Tamasese Lealofi III was shot from behind and killed while trying to bring calm and order to the Mau demonstrators. Ten others died that day and approximately 50 were injured by gunshot wounds and police batons. That day would come to be known in Samoa as Black Saturday. 

On 13 January 1930, the New Zealanders banned the organisation. As many as 1500 Mau men took to the bush, pursued by an armed force of 150 marines and seamen from the light cruiser HMS Dunedin, and 50 military police. Villages were raided, often at night and with fixed bayonets. In March, through the mediation of local Europeans and missionaries, Mau leaders met New Zealand’s Minister of Defence and agreed to disperse.

Supporters of the Mau continued to be arrested, so women came to the fore rallying supporters and staging demonstrations. The political stalemate was broken following the victory of the Labour Party in New Zealand's 1935 general election. A 'goodwill mission' to Apia in June 1936 recognised the Mau as a legitimate political organisation, and Olaf Nelson was allowed to return from exile. In September 1936, Samoans exercised for the first time the right to elect the members of the advisory Fono of Faipule, with representatives of the Mau movement winning 31 of the 39 seats.

Independence

As Western Samoa (1962–1997)

After repeated efforts by the Samoan independence movement, the New Zealand Western Samoa Act 1961 of 24 November 1961 terminated the Trusteeship Agreement and granted the country independence as the Independent State of Western Samoa, effective on 1 January 1962. Western Samoa, the first small-island country in the Pacific to become independent, signed a Treaty of Friendship with New Zealand later in 1962. Western Samoa joined the Commonwealth of Nations on 28 August 1970. While independence was achieved at the beginning of January, Samoa annually celebrates 1 June as its independence day.

On 15 December 1976, Western Samoa was admitted to the United Nations as the 147th member state. It asked to be referred to in the United Nations as the Independent State of Samoa.

Travel writer Paul Theroux noted marked differences between the societies in Western Samoa and American Samoa in 1992.

As Samoa (1997 onwards)

On 4 July 1997 the government amended the constitution to change the name of the country from Western Samoa to Samoa, the name it had been called by in the United Nations since it joined. American Samoa protested against the name change, asserting that it diminished its own identity.

In 2002, New Zealand prime minister Helen Clark formally apologised for New Zealand's role in the Spanish influenza outbreak in 1918 that killed over a quarter of Samoa's population and for the Black Saturday killings in 1929.

On 7 September 2009, the government changed the rule of the road from right to left, in common with most other Commonwealth countries - most notably countries in the region such as Australia and New Zealand, home to large numbers of Samoans. This made Samoa the first country in the 21st century to switch to driving on the left.

At the end of December 2011, Samoa changed its time zone offset from UTC−11 to UTC+13, effectively jumping forward by one day, omitting Friday, 30 December from the local calendar. This also had the effect of changing the shape of the International Date Line, moving it to the east of the territory. This change aimed to help the nation boost its economy in doing business with Australia and New Zealand. Before this change, Samoa was 21 hours behind Sydney, but the change means it is now three hours ahead. The previous time zone, implemented on 4 July 1892, operated in line with American traders based in California. In October 2021, Samoa ceased daylight saving time.

In 2017, Samoa signed the UN treaty on the Prohibition of Nuclear Weapons.

In June 2017, Parliament amended Article 1 of the Samoan Constitution to make Christianity the state religion.

In May 2021, Fiamē Naomi Mataʻafa became Samoa's first female prime minister. Mataʻafa's FAST party narrowly won the election, ending the rule of long-term Prime Minister Tuila'epa Sa'ilele Malielegaoi of the Human Rights Protection Party (HRPP), although the constitutional crisis complicated and delayed this. On 24 May 2021, she was sworn in as the new prime minister, though it was not until July that the Supreme Court ruled that her swearing-in was legal, thus ending the constitutional crisis and bringing an end to Tuila'epa's 22-year premiership. The FAST party's success in the 2021 election and subsequent court rulings also ended nearly four decades of HRPP rule.

In August 2022, Samoa’s Legislative Assembly reappointed Tuimaleali’ifano Vaaletoa Sualauvi II as the Head of State for a second term of five years.

Government and politics

The 1960 constitution, which formally came into force with independence from New Zealand in 1962, builds on the British pattern of parliamentary democracy, modified to take account of Samoan customs. The national modern Government of Samoa is referred to as the Malo.

Fiame Mata'afa Faumuina Mulinu'u II, one of the four highest-ranking paramount chiefs in the country, became Samoa's first Prime Minister. Two other paramount chiefs at the time of independence were appointed joint heads of state for life. Tupua Tamasese Mea'ole died in 1963, leaving Malietoa Tanumafili II sole head of state until his death on 11 May 2007. The next Head of State was Tui Atua Tupua Tamasese Efi, who was elected by the legislature on 17 June 2007 for a fixed five-year term, and was re-elected unopposed in July 2012. He was succeeded by Tuimalealiifano Va'aletoa Sualauvi II in 2017. Tuimaleali’ifano was reappointed for a second term of five years in 2022.

The unicameral legislature (the Fono) consists of 51 members serving 5-year terms. Forty-nine are matai title-holders elected from territorial districts by Samoans; the other two are chosen by non-Samoans with no chiefly affiliation on separate electoral rolls. At least, 10% of the MPs are women. Universal suffrage was adopted in 1990, but only chiefs (matai) may stand for election to the Samoan seats. There are more than 25,000 matais in the country, about 5% of whom are women. The prime minister, chosen by a majority in the Fono, is appointed by the head of state to form a government. The prime minister's choices for the 12 cabinet positions are appointed by the head of state, subject to the continuing confidence of the Fono.

Prominent women in Samoan politics include the late Laulu Fetauimalemau Mata'afa (1928–2007) from Lotofaga constituency, the wife of Samoa's first prime minister. Their daughter Fiame Naomi Mataʻafa is a high chief and a long-serving senior member of cabinet, who was elected Prime Minister in 2021. Other women in politics include Samoan scholar and eminent professor Aiono Fanaafi Le Tagaloa, orator-chief Matatumua Maimoana and Safuneitu'uga Pa'aga Neri ( the Minister of Communication and Technology).

The judicial system incorporates English common law and local customs. The Supreme Court of Samoa is the court of highest jurisdiction. The Chief Justice of Samoa is appointed by the head of state upon the recommendation of the prime minister.

Administrative divisions

Samoa comprises eleven itūmālō (political districts). These are the traditional eleven districts which predate European arrival. Each district has its own constitutional foundation (fa'avae) based on the traditional order of title precedence found in each district's faalupega (traditional salutations). The capital village of each district administers and coordinates the affairs of the district and confers each district's paramount title, amongst other responsibilities.

For example:

A'ana has its capital at Leulumoega. The paramount 'tama-a-'aiga (royal lineage) title of A'ana is Tuimalealiifano. The paramount pāpā title of A'ana is the Tui A'ana. The orator group which confers this title – the Faleiva (House of Nine) – is based at Leulumoega.

Ātua has its capital at Lufilufi. The paramount 'tama-a-'aiga''' (royal lineage) titles of Ātua are Tupua Tamasese (based in Falefa and Salani) and Mata'afa (based in Amaile and Lotofaga). The two main political families who confer the respective titles are 'Aiga Sā Fenunuivao and 'Aiga Sā Levālasi. The paramount pāpā title of Ātua is the Tui Ātua. The orator group which confers this title - the Faleono (House of Six) - is based at Lufilufi.

Tuamasaga has its capital at Afega. The paramount 'tama-a-'aiga (royal lineage) title of Tuamasaga is the Malietoa title, based in Malie. The main political family that confers the Malietoa title is 'Aiga Sā Malietoa, with Auimatagi as the main speaker for the family. The paramount pāpā titles of Tuamasaga are Gatoaitele (conferred by Afega) and Vaetamasoalii (conferred by Safata).

The eleven itūmālō are identified to be:

On Upolu 
1. Tuamasaga (Afega)1
2. A'ana (Leulumoega)
3. Aiga-i-le-Tai (Mulifanua)2
4. Atua (Lufilufi)3
5. Va'a-o-Fonoti (Samamea)
On Savai'i 
6. Fa'asaleleaga (Safotulafai)
7. Gaga'emauga (Saleaula)4
8. Gaga'ifomauga (Safotu)
9. Vaisigano (Asau)
10. Satupa'itea (Satupa'itea)
11. Palauli (Vailoa)
1 
2 
3 
4 

Human rights

Major areas of concern include the under-representation of women, domestic violence and poor prison conditions. Homosexual acts are illegal in Samoa.

State religion

In June 2017, an Act was passed changing the country's constitution to include a reference to the Trinity. As amended, Article 1 of the Samoan Constitution states that "Samoa is a Christian nation founded on God the Father, the Son and the Holy Spirit". According to The Diplomat, "What Samoa has done is shift references to Christianity into the body of the constitution, giving the text far more potential to be used in legal processes." The preamble to the constitution already described the country as "an independent State based on Christian principles and Samoan custom and traditions."

Military and police

Samoa has no formal defence structure or regular armed forces. It has informal defence ties with New Zealand, which is required to consider any request for assistance from Samoa under the bilateral Treaty of Friendship of 1962.

Officers of the national police force, the Samoa Police Service, are regularly unarmed, but may be armed in exceptional circumstances with ministerial approval. In 2022 there are about 900–1,100 police officers in Samoa.

Geography

Samoa lies south of the equator, about halfway between Hawaii and New Zealand, in the Polynesian region of the Pacific Ocean.

The islets are:

the three islets in the Apolima Strait (Manono Island, Apolima and Nu'ulopa)
the four Aleipata Islands off the eastern end of Upolu (Nu'utele, Nu'ulua, Namua, and Fanuatapu)

The Samoan islands result geologically from volcanism, originating with the Samoa hotspot, which probably results from a mantle plume. While all of the islands have volcanic origins, only Savai'i, the westernmost island in Samoa, remains volcanically active, with the most recent eruptions at Mt Matavanu (1905–1911), Mata o le Afi (1902) and Mauga Afi (1725). The Saleaula lava fields situated on the central north coast of Savai'i result from the Mt Matavanu eruptions, which left  of solidified lava.

Savai'i is the largest of the Samoan islands and the sixth-largest Polynesian island (after New Zealand's North, South and Stewart Islands and the Hawaiian islands of Hawaiʻi and Maui). The population of Savai'i is 42,000 people.

Climate

Ecology

Samoa forms part of the Samoan tropical moist forests ecoregion. Since human habitation began, about 80% of the lowland rainforests have disappeared. Within the ecoregion about 28% of plants and 84% of land birds are endemic.

Economy

The United Nations has classified Samoa as an economically developing country since 2014.  Samoa's gross domestic product in purchasing-power parity was estimated at $1.13 billion U.S. dollars, ranking the country 204th in the world. The services sector accounted for 66% of GDP, followed by industry and agriculture at 23.6% and 10.4% respectively. For the same year, the Samoan labour force was estimated at 50,700.

The Central Bank of Samoa issues and regulates Samoa's currency, the Samoan tālā.
The economy of Samoa has traditionally depended on agriculture and fishing at the local level. In modern times, development aid, private family remittances from overseas, and agricultural exports have become key factors in the nation's economy. Agriculture employs two-thirds of the labour force and furnishes 90% of exports, featuring coconut cream, coconut oil, noni (juice of the nonu fruit, as it is known in Samoan), and copra.

Sixty percent of Samoa's electricity comes from renewable hydro, solar, and wind sources, with the remainder produced by diesel generators. The Electric Power Corporation set a goal of 100% renewable energy by 2021.

Agriculture

In the period before German colonisation (from the late 19th century), Samoa produced mostly copra. German merchants and settlers were active in introducing large-scale plantation operations and in developing new industries, notably cocoa beans and rubber, relying on imported labourers from China and Melanesia. When the value of natural rubber fell drastically, about the end of the Great War (World War I) in 1918, the New Zealand government encouraged the production of bananas, for which there is a large market in New Zealand.

Because of variations in altitude, Samoa can cultivate a large range of tropical and subtropical crops. Land is not generally available to outside interests. About 4.4% is Western Samoan Trust Estates Corporation (WSTEC).

The staple products of Samoa are copra (dried coconut meat), cocoa beans (for chocolate), rubber, and bananas. The annual production of both bananas and copra has been in the range of 13,000 to 15,000 metric tons (about 14,500 to 16,500 short tons). If the Asiatic rhinoceros beetle in Samoa were eradicated, Samoa could produce in excess of 40,000 metric tons (44,000 short tons) of copra. Samoan cocoa beans are of very high quality and are used in fine New Zealand chocolates. Most are Criollo-Forastero hybrids. Coffee grows well, but production has been uneven. WESTEC is the biggest coffee producer.

Other agricultural industries have proven less successful. Sugarcane production was originally established by Germans in the early 20th century. Old train tracks for transporting cane can be seen at some plantations east of Apia. Pineapples grow well in Samoa, but have not moved beyond local consumption to become a major export.

Demographics

Samoa reported a population of 194,320 in its 2016 census. About three-quarters of the population live on the main island of Upolu.

Health

A measles outbreak began in October 2019. As of 7 December, there have been 68 deaths (0.31 per 1,000, based on a population of 201,316) and over 4,460 cases (2.2% of the population) of measles in Samoa, mainly children under four years old, and 10 reported cases in Fiji. It is expected that 70 people will die and up to 6,500 people will be infected.

Ethnic groups

The population is 96% Samoans, 2% dual Samoan-New Zealander and 1.9% other, according to a 2011 estimate in the CIA World Factbook.

Languages

Samoan (Gagana Fa'asāmoa) and English are the official languages. Including second-language speakers, there are more speakers of Samoan than English in Samoa. Samoan Sign Language is also commonly used among the deaf population of Samoa. To emphasize the importance of full inclusion with sign language, elementary Samoan Sign Language was taught to members of the Samoa Police Service, Red Cross Society, and public during the 2017 International Week of the Deaf.

Religion

Since 2017, Article 1 of the Samoan Constitution states that "Samoa is a Christian nation founded of God the Father, the Son and the Holy Spirit".

Samoans' religious adherence includes the following: Christian Congregational Church of Samoa 31.8%, Roman Catholic 19.4%, Methodist 15.2%, Assembly of God 13.7%, The Church of Jesus Christ of Latter-day Saints 7.6%, Seventh-day Adventist 3.9%, Worship Centre 1.7%, other Christian 5.5%, other 0.7%, none 0.1%, unspecified 0.1% (2011 estimate). The Head of State until 2007, Malietoa Tanumafili II, was a Baháʼí. Samoa hosts the seventh (of nine current) Baháʼí Houses of Worship in the world; completed in 1984 and dedicated by the Head of State, it is located in Tiapapata,  from Apia.

Education
The Samoan government provides eight years of primary and secondary education that is tuition-free and is compulsory through age 16.

Samoa's main post-secondary educational institution is the National University of Samoa, established in 1984. The country is also home to several branches of the multi-national University of the South Pacific and the Oceania University of Medicine.

Education in Samoa has proved to be effective as a 2012 UNESCO report stated that 99 per cent of Samoan adults are literate. 

The Human Rights Measurement Initiative (HRMI) finds that Samoa is fulfilling only 88.0% of what it should be fulfilling for the right to education based on the country's level of income. HRMI breaks down the right to education by looking at the rights to both primary education and secondary education. While taking into consideration Samoa's income level, the nation is achieving 97.7% of what should be possible based on its resources (income) for primary education but only 78.3% for secondary education.

Culture

The fa'a Samoa, or traditional Samoan way, remains a strong force in Samoan life and politics. As one of the oldest Polynesian cultures, the fa'a Samoa developed over a period of 3,000 years, withstanding centuries of European influence to maintain its historical customs, social and political systems, and language. Cultural customs such as the Samoa 'ava ceremony are significant and solemn rituals at important occasions including the bestowal of matai chiefly titles. Items of great cultural value include the finely woven 'ie toga.

Samoan mythology includes many gods with creation stories and figures of legend such as Tagaloa and the goddess of war Nafanua, the daughter of Saveasi'uleo, ruler of the spirit realm Pulotu. Other legends include the well known story of Sina and the Eel which explains the origins of the first coconut tree.

Some Samoans are spiritual and religious, and have subtly adapted the dominant religion of Christianity to 'fit in' with fa'a Samoa and vice versa. Ancient beliefs continue to co-exist side by side with Christianity, particularly in regard to the traditional customs and rituals of fa'a Samoa. The Samoan culture is centred on the principle of vāfealoa'i, the relationships between people. These relationships are based on respect, or fa'aaloalo. When Christianity was introduced in Samoa, most Samoan people converted. Currently 98% of the population identify themselves as Christian.

Some Samoans live a communal way of life, participating in activities collectively. Examples of this are the traditional Samoan fale (houses) which are open with no walls, using blinds made of coconut palm fronds during the night or bad weather.

The Samoan siva dance has unique gentle movements of the body in time to music and tells a story, although the Samoan male dances can be more snappy. The sasa is also a traditional dance where rows of dancers perform rapid synchronised movements in time to the rhythm of wooden drums (pate) or rolled mats. Another dance performed by males is called the fa'ataupati or the slap dance, creating rhythmic sounds by slapping different parts of the body. This is believed to have been derived from slapping insects on the body.

The form and construction of traditional architecture of Samoa was a specialised skill by Tufuga fai fale that was also linked to other cultural artforms.

Tattooing

As with other Polynesian cultures (Hawaiian, Tahitian and Māori) with significant and unique tattoos, Samoans have two gender specific and culturally significant tattoos. For males, it is called the Pe'a and consists of intricate and geometrical patterns tattooed that cover areas from the knees up towards the ribs. A male who possesses such a tatau is called a soga'imiti. A Samoan girl or teine is given a malu, which covers the area from just below her knees to her upper thighs.

Contemporary culture

Albert Wendt is a significant Samoan writer whose novels and stories tell the Samoan experience. In 1989, his novel Flying Fox in a Freedom Tree was made into a feature film in New Zealand, directed by Martyn Sanderson. Another novel Sons for the Return Home had also been made into a feature film in 1979, directed by Paul Maunder.

The late John Kneubuhl, born in American Samoa, was an accomplished playwright and screenwriter and writer. His play Think of Garden premiered in Auckland in 1993 a year after his death, it was directed by Nathaniel Lees, is set in 1929 and is about Samoa's struggle for independence.

Sia Figiel won the 1997 Commonwealth Writers' Prize for fiction in the south-east Asia/South Pacific region with her novel "Where We Once Belonged".

Momoe Malietoa Von Reiche is an internationally recognised poet and artist.

Tusiata Avia is a performance poet. Her first book of poetry Wild Dogs Under My Skirt was published by Victoria University Press in 2004.
Dan Taulapapa McMullin is an artist and writer.

Other Samoan poets and writers include Sapa'u Ruperake Petaia, Eti Sa'aga and Savea Sano Malifa, the editor of the Samoa Observer.

In music, popular local bands include The Five Stars, Penina o Tiafau and Punialava'a.
The Yandall Sisters' cover of the song Sweet Inspiration reached number one on the New Zealand charts in 1974.

King Kapisi was the first hip hop artist to receive the prestigious New Zealand APRA Silver Scroll Award in 1999 for his song Reverse Resistance. The music video for Reverse Resistance was filmed in Savai'i at his villages.

Other successful Samoan hip hop artists include rapper Scribe, Dei Hamo, Savage and Tha Feelstyle whose music video Suamalie was filmed in Samoa.

Lemi Ponifasio is a director and choreographer who is prominent internationally with his dance Company MAU.
Neil Ieremia's company Black Grace has also received international acclaim with tours to Europe and New York.

Hip hop has had a significant impact on Samoan culture. According to Katerina Martina Teaiwa, PhD from the University of Hawaii at Manoa, "Hip hop culture in particular is popular amongst Samoan youth." As in many other countries, hip hop music is popular. In addition, the integration of hip hop elements into Samoan tradition also "testifies to the transferability of the dance forms themselves," and to the "circuits through which people and all their embodied knowledge travel." Dance both in its traditional form and its more modern forms has remained a central cultural currency to Samoans, especially youths.

The arts organisation Tautai Pacific Arts Trust was an informal collective of visual artists including Fatu Feu'u, Johnny Penisula, Shigeyuki Kihara, Michel Tuffery, and Lily Laita in the 1980s and formalised into a trust in 1995 and is now a leading Pacific arts organisation directed by Courtney Sina Meredith.Yamauchi, C. (2014). Talking Story about Art and Life: Narratives of Contemporary Oceanic Artists and Their Work. Marilyn Kohlhase ran a Pacific focused gallery called Okaioceanikart from 2007–2013.

Director Sima Urale is a filmmaker. Urale's short film O Tamaiti won the prestigious Best Short Film at the Venice Film Festival in 1996. Her first feature film Apron Strings opened the 2008 NZ International Film Festival. The feature film Siones Wedding, co-written by Oscar Kightley, was financially successful following premieres in Auckland and Apia. The 2011 film The Orator was the first ever fully Samoan film, shot in Samoa in the Samoan language with a Samoan cast telling a uniquely Samoan story. Written and directed by Tusi Tamasese, it received much critical acclaim and attention at film festivals throughout the world.

Sport

The main sports played in Samoa are rugby union, Samoan cricket and netball. Rugby union is the national football code of Samoa. In Samoan villages, volleyball is also popular.

Rugby union is the national sport in Samoa and the national team, nicknamed the Manu Samoa, is consistently competitive against teams from vastly more populous nations. Samoa has competed at every Rugby World Cup since 1991, and made the quarter finals in 1991, 1995 and the second round of the 1999 World Cup. At the 2003 world cup, Manu Samoa came close to beating eventual world champions, England. Samoa also played in the Pacific Nations Cup and the Pacific Tri-Nations. The sport is governed by the Samoa Rugby Football Union, who are members of the Pacific Islands Rugby Alliance, and thus, also contribute to the international Pacific Islanders rugby union team.

At club level, there is the National Provincial Championship and Pacific Rugby Cup. They also took home the cup at Wellington and the Hong Kong Rugby Sevens in 2007—for which the Prime Minister of Samoa, also Chairman of the national rugby union, Tuila’epa Sa’ilele Malielegaoi, declared a national holiday. They were also the IRB World Sevens Series Champions in 2010 capping a year of achievement for the Samoans, following wins in the US, Australia, Hong Kong and Scotland Sevens tournaments.

Prominent Samoan players include Pat Lam and Brian Lima. In addition, many Samoans have played for or are playing for New Zealand.

Rugby league is mostly played by Samoans living in New Zealand and Australia. Samoa reached the quarter finals of the 2013 Rugby League World Cup, the team comprising players from the NRL and Super League plus domestic players. Many Samoans and New Zealanders or Australians of Samoan descent play in the Super League and National Leagues in Britain, including Francis Meli, Ta'ane Lavulavu of Workington Town, Maurie Fa'asavalu of St Helens, David Fatialofa of Whitehaven and Setaimata Sa, who signed with London Irish rugby club. Other noteworthy players from NZ and Australia have represented the Samoan National team. The 2011 domestic Samoan rugby league competition contained 10 teams with plans to expand to 12 in 2012. Samoa reached the final of the 2021 Rugby League World Cup to face Australia.

Samoans have been very visible in boxing, kickboxing, wrestling, and sumo; some Samoan sumo wrestlers, most famously Musashimaru and Konishiki, have reached the highest rank of Ozeki and yokozuna.

American football is occasionally played in Samoa, reflecting its wide popularity in American Samoa, where the sport is played under high school sanction. About 30 ethnic Samoans, many from American Samoa, currently play in the National Football League. A 2002 article from ESPN estimated that a Samoan male (either an American Samoan or a Samoan living in the mainland United States) is 40 times more likely to play in the NFL than a non-Samoan American.

See also

Outline of Samoa

Footnotes

References

Further reading

Watson, R M, History of Samoa (Wellington, 1918)
Meleisea, Malama. The Making of Modern Samoa: Traditional Authority and Colonial Administration in the Modern History of Western Samoa. (Suva, 1987) Institute of Pacific Studies, University of the South Pacific.
Schnee, Dr. Heinrich (former Deputy Governor of German Samoa and last Governor of German East Africa). 1926. German Colonization, Past and Future: The Truth about the German Colonies. London: George Allen & Unwin.
Eustis, Nelson. [1979] 1980. Aggie Grey of Samoa. Adelaide, South Australia: Hobby Investments. .

Mead, Margaret. 1928, Coming of Age in Samoa: A Study of Adolescence and Sex in Primitive Societies. 
Freeman, Derek. 1983. Margaret Mead in Samoa: the Making and Unmaking of an Anthropological Myth.
Urmenyhazi Attila. 2013 Samoan & Marquesan Life in Oceania: a probing travelogue.  – National Library of Australia, Bib ID: 6377055.
Mallon, Sean. 2002. Samoan Art and Artists. O Measina a Samoa. Honolulu: University of Hawaii Press. 

External links

Government
Government of Samoa
Chief of State and Cabinet Members

General information
Samoa. The World Factbook. Central Intelligence Agency.
University of Colorado  from UCB Libraries GovPubs''

Samoa from the BBC News

Samoa Tourism Authority
Key Development Forecasts for Samoa from International Futures

 
1962 establishments in Oceania
Archipelagoes of the Pacific Ocean
Countries in Polynesia
English-speaking countries and territories
Island countries
Member states of the Commonwealth of Nations
Member states of the United Nations
Small Island Developing States
States and territories established in 1962
Republics in the Commonwealth of Nations
Christian states
Countries in Oceania
Former least developed countries